Lacmalac is a rural community in the central east part of the Riverina.  It is situated by road, about 9 kilometres east of Tumut and 19 kilometres south east of Gocup. 

A part of the localities now known as  Lacmalac and Little River was one of the sites proposed for Australia's national capital city. it was one of two sites near Tumut; the other being at Gadara to the west of Tumut. If the proposal for a new city at Little River-Laclamac had come to fruition, the Tumut railway line would have been extended to the area and a dam built on Goobarragandra River to provide a water supply.

Notes and references

Towns in the Riverina
Towns in New South Wales
Proposed sites for national capital of Australia